Pål Thonstad Sandvik (born 1967) is a Norwegian historian. He is professor in economic and business history at the Norwegian University of Science and Technology, Trondheim. He has published extensively on the modern history of Norway. Among his most well-known work is his contribution to the commissioned history about the large Norwegian company Norsk Hydro, which sparked considerable controversy upon publication.

He graduated from the University of Trondheim in 1993 as a cand.philol. in history, and has since published major works on the history of the city of Kristiansand, Falconbridge Ltd.'s nickel refinery in Norway  and the history of the Trøndelag region.  In November 2008, he defended the thesis "The Making of a Subsidiary, Falconbridge Nikkelverk, 1910-1929-2004" for the degree of PhD at NTNU, Trondheim.

References

External links
 https://web.archive.org/web/20080917144544/http://www.hf.ntnu.no/hf/historie/Ansatte/paal.sandvik/personInfo.html

1967 births
Living people
20th-century Norwegian historians
Academic staff of the Norwegian University of Science and Technology
21st-century Norwegian historians